Sans fusils, ni souliers, à Paris: Martha Wainwright's Piaf Record is a live album by Canadian-American singer-songwriter Martha Wainwright featuring Thomas Bartlett, Doug Wieselman, and Brad Albetta, and is a tribute to French singer Édith Piaf. The album was recorded during three performances in New York's Dixon Place Theatre in June 2009. The accompanying DVD was filmed by Jamie Catto. The album was released (number MRCD6523) in Canada on MapleMusic Recordings. On November 11, 2009, Wainwright recreated her New York performances at London's Barbican Centre. The album cover photography was shot by JC Hopkins. The name of the album comes from the lyrics of the song "Les Grognards".

Track listing
"La Foule"
"Adieu mon cœur"
"Une enfant"
"L'Accordéoniste"
"Le Brun et le Blond"
"Les Grognards"
"C'est toujours la même histoire"
"Hudsonia"
"C'est à Hambourg"
"Non, la vie n'est pas triste"
"Soudain une vallée"
"Marie Trottoir"
"Le Métro de Paris"
"Le Chant d'amour"
"Les Blouses blanches"

DVD
"Le Chant d'amour" (live)
"La Foule" (live)
"Non, la vie n'est pas triste" (live)
"Adieu mon cœur" (live)

Charts

References

2009 live albums
2009 video albums
Live video albums
albums produced by Hal Willner
MapleMusic Recordings live albums
Martha Wainwright albums
French-language live albums